Margarites avenosooki is a species of sea snail, a marine gastropod mollusk in the family Margaritidae.

References

External links
 To USNM Invertebrate Zoology Mollusca Collection
 To World Register of Marine Species

avenosooki
Gastropods described in 1959